L'art pompier (literally 'fireman art') or style pompier is a derisive late-19th century French term for large 'official' academic art paintings of the time, especially historical or allegorical ones. The term derives from the helmets with horse-hair tails, worn at the time by French firemen, which are similar to the Attic helmets often worn in such works by allegorical personifications, classical warriors, or Napoleonic cavalry.  It also suggests half-puns in French with pompéien ('from Pompeii') and pompeux ('pompous'). This type of art was seen by those who used the term as the epitome of the values of the bourgeoisie, and as insincere and overblown.

L'art pompier (a term supporters mostly avoid) has enjoyed something of a critical revival in the last twenty years, partly caused by the new Musée d'Orsay in Paris, where it is displayed on more equal terms with the Impressionists and Realist painters of the period.

The Manifeste Pompier ('Fireman Manifesto') by Louis-Marie Lecharny was published in Paris in 1990. He also wrote L'art Pompier (1998).
 
William-Adolphe Bouguereau, Paul-Jacques-Aimé Baudry, Alfred Agache, Alexandre Cabanel, Joseph-Noël Sylvestre and Thomas Couture are among the classic artists of this genre.

Notes

References
Harding, James. Artistes pompiers: French academic art in the 19th century, New York: Rizzoli, 1979.

External links
Article on Peut-on parler d’une peinture pompier?, by Jacques Thuillier, www.dezenovevinte.net (in French)

French art
French art movements

fr:Art pompier